The 1921 Miami Redskins football team was an American football team that represented Miami University as a member of the Ohio Athletic Conference (OAC) during the 1921 college football season. In its fourth and final season under head coach George Little, Miami compiled an 8–0 record (7–0 against conference opponents), shut out six of eight opponents, and won the OAC championship.

Schedule

References

Miami
Miami RedHawks football seasons
Miami Redskins football